Jin is an upcoming Bangladeshi psycho-thriller film. The film directed by Nader Chowdhury and co-produced by Abdul Aziz and Alimullah Khokon under the banner of Jaaz Multimedia. It feature Ziaul Roshan and Puja Cherry played in the lead roles with Shajal, Jannatun Nur Moon and Shahid un Nabi played important roles in the film. The principal photography of film begun in August 2019.

Cast
 Shajal as Rafsan, a professional photographer
 Puja Cherry as Monalisa, Rafsan's wife
 Ziaul Roshan
 Jannatun Nur Moon
 Shahid Un Nabi
 Sujata

Soundtrack

The soundtrack of film composed by Javed Ahmed Kislu.

References

External links
 

Upcoming films
Bengali-language Bangladeshi films
Psychological thriller films
Jaaz Multimedia films